Jacques A. Beaulieu,  (born April 15, 1932) is a Canadian physicist who invented the first TEA laser in 1968.

Awards 
In 1978, he was awarded the Royal Society of Canada's Thomas W. Eadie Medal. In 1980, he was made a Fellow of the Royal Society of Canada.

In 1999, he was made a Grand Officer of the National Order of Quebec. 

In 2002, he was made an Officer of the Order of Canada in recognition of his "major influence on the development of lasers and their application in the fields of defence and medicine".

References

External links
 Researcher emeritus to receive the National Order of Quebec
 National Order of Quebec citation 

1932 births
Canadian physicists
Fellows of the Royal Society of Canada
Grand Officers of the National Order of Quebec
2014 deaths
Officers of the Order of Canada
People from Saint-Jean-sur-Richelieu